The 2002 season was the Jacksonville Jaguars' 8th in the National Football League and their eight and final under head coach Tom Coughlin.  The team matched their 2001 record of 6–10  and finished 3rd place in the AFC South, missing the playoffs for the third season in a row. This was Mark Brunell's final full season as the Jaguars' starting quarterback. Tom Coughlin was fired after this season and replaced by Jack Del Rio the following season.

Offseason

2002 expansion draft

Draft

Undrafted free agents

Personnel

Staff

Roster

Regular season

Schedule

Note: Intra-division opponents are in bold text.

Game summaries

Week 2: at Kansas City Chiefs

Week 4: vs. New York Jets

Standings

References

Jacksonville Jaguars
Jacksonville Jaguars seasons
Jackson